The 1918 Campeonato Paulista, organized by the APEA (Associação Paulista de Esportes Atléticos), was the 17th season of São Paulo's top association football league. After the sixth round, Palestra Itália abandoned the championship in protest against the refereeing in their match against Paulistano. Then, the championship was interrupted in October, when the Spanish flu hit Brazil, and did not return until December. As a result, multiple matches that did not have any bearing in the title dispute were cancelled and the championship only ended in January 1919. Paulistano won the title for the 6th time. The top scorer was Paulistano's Arthur Friedenreich with 25 goals.

System
The championship was disputed in a double-round robin system, with the team with the most points winning the title.

Championship

References

Campeonato Paulista seasons
Paulista